Anolis eugenegrahami, commonly known as Eugene's anole or the black stream anole, is a species of lizard in the family Dactyloidae. The species is endemic to northern Haiti.

Etymology
The specific name, eugenegrahami, is in honor of herpetologist Eugene D. Graham Jr., who was one of the collectors of the holotype.

Geographic range

Habitat
The preferred natural habitat of A. eugenegrahami is stream margins in gallery forest.

Description and behavior
This species, A. eugenegrahami, is of moderate size, with extremely long limbs. Males and females are both very dark. The dewlap (male only) ranges from very dark gray to black, with the edge being lighter.

It is one of two semi-aquatic anoles from the Caribbean, the other being A. vermiculatus of Cuba.

See also
List of Anolis lizards

References

Anoles
Lizards of the Caribbean
Reptiles of Haiti
Endemic fauna of Haiti
Reptiles described in 1978
Taxa named by Albert Schwartz (zoologist)